Heaven's Open is the 14th record album performed by Mike Oldfield, released in 1991. It was his last album on Virgin, and also the only album he released under the name Michael Oldfield, instead of Mike Oldfield. The producer of the album, Tom Newman's name is also spelled out in a similar manner, as Thom Newman.

History 
By 1991 and the release of Heaven's Open, Oldfield was happy to leave Virgin Records. The final goodbye to Virgin appears at the very end of "Music from the Balcony", where quiet laughter and Oldfield's voice saying "Fuck off!" can be heard.

Heaven's Open is Oldfield's only album where he performs all the lead vocals himself, due to his having come to terms with the sound of his own voice.

After leaving Virgin, Oldfield released the anticipated Tubular Bells II in 1992 with Warner Brothers.

Connections to other Oldfield albums 
The album's cover is a reworked version of a photo originally taken for Tubular Bells, when the working title was Breakfast in Bed. In this cover art, blood was pictured dripping from the egg, rather than yolk. The working title for Heaven's Open was Man in the Rain. The song "Heaven's Open" comes largely from an early version of "Man in the Rain". The "Man in the Rain" title would later be used by Oldfield as a single from the Tubular Bells III album.

Stylistically, Heaven's Open returns to the format of Oldfield's commercially oriented records of the early to mid-1980s, and features a selection of accessible pop/rock songs, as well as a more progressive long-form piece.  Unlike previous albums such as Five Miles Out and Crises, the album's longer composition closes the album as opposed to opening it, as with Oldfield's album Discovery.

Singles 
"Gimme Back" and the title track "Heaven's Open" were released as singles in 1991. Both were also released under the name Michael Oldfield.

Equipment 
Musical equipment on the album includes Atari, C-Lab and Fairlight products. Also featured are Roland D50, MKS-80 and D550s, an Akai S900, S1000 and S1100, an EMU Proteus, a Korg M1 a Yamaha DX5 and the Steinberg 'Topaz'. A Harrison series X mixing console, a Sony 3348 digital tape machine and microphones made by Bruel & Kjaer were used in the creation of the album.

Track listing 
All tracks written by Mike Oldfield.

Side one
 "Make Make" – 4:18
 "No Dream" – 6:02
 "Mr. Shame" – 4:22
 "Gimme Back" – 4:12
 "Heaven's Open" – 4:31

Side two
 "Music from the Balcony" – 19:44

Personnel 
 Mike Oldfield – vocals, guitars, keyboards
 Simon Phillips – drums
 Dave Levy – bass
 Mickey Simmonds – Hammond organ, piano
 Andrew Longhurst – additional keyboards, sequencing and samples
 Courtney Pine – saxophones, bass clarinet
 The "Sassy Choir"
 Vicki St. James
 Sylvia Mason-James
 Dolly James
 Debi Doss
 Shirlie Roden
 Valeria Etienne
 Additional vocal harmonies
 Anita Hegerland
 Nikki "B" Bentley
 Tom Newman

References

External links 
 Mike Oldfield Discography - Heaven's Open at Tubular.net

Mike Oldfield albums
1991 albums
Concept albums
Virgin Records albums
Albums produced by Tom Newman (musician)